Mark Edward Kachowski (born February 20, 1965) is a Canadian former ice hockey player. A left winger, he played three seasons in the National Hockey League (NHL) for the Pittsburgh Penguins from 1987 to 1990. Kachowski was born in Edmonton, Alberta.

Career statistics

Regular season and playoffs

External links
 

1965 births
Living people
Canadian ice hockey left wingers
Flint Spirits players
Kamloops Blazers players
Kamloops Junior Oilers players
Muskegon Lumberjacks players
Pittsburgh Penguins players
Ice hockey people from Edmonton
Undrafted National Hockey League players